Elachista scobifera is a moth of the family Elachistidae that is found in Arizona.

The ground colour of the forewings is white. There are light grey scales along the veins and there is a weak cilia line of the same colour. The hindwings are whitish to light grey and the underside of the wings is grey.

Etymology
The species name is derived from Latin scobis and -fera (meaning bearing dust).

References

Moths described in 1997
scobifera
Endemic fauna of Arizona
Moths of North America